The 2008–09 Sussex County Football League season was the 84th in the history of Sussex County Football League a football competition in England.

Division One

Division One featured 17 clubs which competed in the division last season, along with three new clubs:
East Grinstead Town, promoted from Division Two
Horsham YMCA, relegated from the Isthmian League
Lingfield, promoted from Division Two

League table

Division Two

Division Two featured 14 clubs which competed in the division last season, along with four new clubs.
Clubs relegated from Division One:
Rye United
Sidley United
Clubs promoted from Division Three:
Bexhill United
Loxwood

League table

Division Three

Division Three featured eleven clubs which competed in the division last season, along with three new clubs:
Broadbridge Heath, relegated from Division Two
Clymping, joined from the West Sussex League
Pease Pottage Village, relegated from Division Two

League table

References

2008-09
9